Handapa railway station is a railway station on Cuttack–Sambalpur line under the Sambalpur railway division of the East Coast Railway zone. The railway station is situated beside Sambalpur-Cuttack Road at Baisana in Angul district of the Indian state of Odisha.

References

Railway stations in Angul district
Sambalpur railway division